Argyranthemum (marguerite, marguerite daisy, dill daisy) is a genus of flowering plants belonging to the family Asteraceae.  Members of this genus are sometimes also placed in the genus Chrysanthemum.

The genus is endemic to Macaronesia, occurring only on the Canary Islands, the Savage Islands, and Madeira.

Argyranthemum frutescens is recorded as a food plant of the leaf-mining larva of the moth Bucculatrix chrysanthemella.

Species
, Plants of the World Online accepted the following species:

Argyranthemum adauctum (Link) Humphries
Argyranthemum broussonetii (Pers.) Humphries
Argyranthemum callichrysum (Svent.) Humphries
Argyranthemum coronopifolium (Willd.) Webb
Argyranthemum dissectum (Lowe) Lowe
Argyranthemum escarrei (Svent.) Humphries
Argyranthemum filifolium (Sch.Bip.) Humphries
Argyranthemum foeniculaceum (Willd.) Webb ex Sch.Bip.
Argyranthemum frutescens (L.) Sch.Bip.
Argyranthemum gracile Sch.Bip.
Argyranthemum haematomma Lowe
Argyranthemum haouarytheum Humphries & Bramwell
Argyranthemum hierrense Humphries
Argyranthemum lemsii Humphries
Argyranthemum lidii Humphries
Argyranthemum maderense (D.Don) Humphries
Argyranthemum pinnatifidum (L.f.) Webb
Argyranthemum sundingii L.Borgen
Argyranthemum sventenii Humphries & Aldridge
Argyranthemum tenerifae Humphries
Argyranthemum thalassophilum (Svent.) Humphries
Argyranthemum webbii Sch.Bip.
Argyranthemum winteri (Svent.) Humphries

Cultivation

Hybrids of Argyranthemum species, some involving species in related genera, are widely sold as ornamental plants for summer bedding or containers. These cultivars produce prolific single or double-flowered daisy-like flowers in shades of white, pink, yellow and purple throughout summer. In the UK climate, they are generally half-hardy, and can be grown from seed or cuttings, or purchased as young plants to be planted out after all danger of frost has passed.

Gallery

References

External links
 http://www.theplantlist.org/tpl/search?q=argyranthemum

Glebionidinae
Endemic flora of Macaronesia
Flora of the Canary Islands
Flora of Madeira
Asteraceae genera